Prior Radiofabrikk was a radio manufacturing company in Oslo, Norway.

It was established in 1949, and was owned and ran by the cooperative Norges Kooperative Landsforening. The production facility was located at Bjølsen, co-located with Margarinfabrikken Norge. The company was bought by Luma Fabrikker in 1962, and production ceased in 1963.

References

Electronics companies established in 1949
1949 establishments in Norway
Electronics companies disestablished in 1963
Manufacturing companies based in Oslo
Electronics companies of Norway
Defunct companies of Norway
1963 disestablishments in Norway